is a former Japanese football player.

Club statistics

References

External links

1983 births
Living people
Waseda University alumni
Association football people from Tokyo
Japanese footballers
J2 League players
Japan Football League players
Mito HollyHock players
Tokyo Musashino United FC players
Association football forwards